Simi Valley is a city in the valley of the same name, is in the southeast corner of Ventura County, California. It was incorporated on October 10, 1969. Simi Valley's government uses the "Council-Manager" form of government.  This means that the city council is composed of one mayor, elected every two years.

Mayors 
Lester Cleveland                 1969–1972
Ted Grandsen                     1972–1974
Jim Smith                        1974–1976
William Carpenter                1976–1978
Ginger Gherardi                  1978–1979 (first female mayor)
Cathie Wright                1979–1980
Elton Gallegly               1980–1986
Gregory Stratton                 1986–1998 (longest serving mayor)
Bill Davis                       1998–2004
Paul Miller                      2004–2010
Bob Huber                        2010–2018
Keith Mashburn                   2018–2022
Fred D. Thomas                   2022-Present

References 

Simi Valley